Richard Hugh Britnell  (21 April 1944, in Wrexham – 17 December 2013) was Professor (later Professor Emeritus) of the Department of History, University of Durham. An economic historian, his work demonstrated that "commerce played an essential part in medieval life". His obituary in The Guardian stated that "Not many academics can be said to have moved the boundaries of their subject, yet no one meeting Richard encountered any pretension or flamboyance". He was a prolific author.

Career
Britnell was born on 21 April 1944, the son of Ronald Britnell and Edith (née Mason), both of whom were teachers. He was educated at Bedford Modern School and Clare College, Cambridge.

After Cambridge, Britnell was appointed a lecturer at Durham University, initially in the economic history department. He later moved to the history department where he was made a professor in 1997 although forced to take early retirement in 2003 due to ill health. However, he continued to work as emeritus professor and continued to publish work and be involved in the life of the university and the city.

Britnell's academic work dealt with medieval economic history, a field in which he was regarded as a pioneer. He was a prolific author and in 2005 was elected Fellow of the British Academy. His obituary in The Guardian stated that "Not many academics can be said to have moved the boundaries of their subject, yet no one meeting Richard encountered any pretension or flamboyance".

Family life
In 1973, Britnell married Jenny, a lecturer in French at Durham University; they had two sons.  Britnell died on 17 December 2013.

Selected publications
 "Bureaucracy and literacy" in Lansing, C. and English, E.D. (eds.), A companion to the medieval world. Chichester: Wiley-Blackwell, pp. 413–434; .
 "The Commercialisation of English Society, 1000-1500". Cambridge: Cambridge University Press, 1993. .
 (ed., with A. J. Pollard) The McFarlane Legacy: Studies in Late-Medieval Politics and Society. Stroud: Sutton (1995) .
 "Markets, Trade and Economic Development in England and Europe, 1050-1550". Ashgate, 2009..

References

External links
Richard Britnell's personal webpage

Academics of Durham University
People educated at Bedford Modern School
Alumni of Clare College, Cambridge
British historians
Economic historians
1944 births
2013 deaths
Fellows of the British Academy
People from Wrexham
Place of death missing
Surtees Society